The 2014 California Attorney General election was held on November 4, 2014, to elect the Attorney General of California. Incumbent Democratic Attorney General Kamala Harris won re-election to a second term in office.

A primary election was held on June 3, 2014. Under California's nonpartisan blanket primary law, all candidates appear on the same ballot, regardless of party. In the primary, voters may vote for any candidate, regardless of their party affiliation. The top two finishers — regardless of party — advance to the general election in November, even if a candidate manages to receive a majority of the votes cast in the primary election. Harris and Republican Ronald Gold finished first and second, respectively, and contested the general election, which Harris won by a margin of 14.98%.

Primary election

Candidates

Democratic Party
 Kamala Harris, incumbent Attorney General

Republican Party
 Ronald Gold, former Deputy Attorney General
 John Haggerty
 David King
 Phil Wyman, former State Assemblyman and former State Senator

Libertarian Party
 Jonathan Jaech

No Party Preference
 Orly Taitz, "birther" activist, candidate for Secretary of State of California in 2010 and for the U.S. Senate in 2012

Results

General election

Polling

Results

References

External links
Attorney General - Statewide Results
California Attorney General election, 2014 at Ballotpedia
Campaign contributions at FollowTheMoney.org

Official campaign websites
Ron Gold for Attorney General of California
John Haggerty for California Attorney General 2014
Kamala Harris 2014
Jonathan Jaech for California Attorney General
David King for Attorney General
Orly Taitz for California Attorney General
Wyman for Attorney General

Attorney General
California Attorney General elections
California
Kamala Harris